Ice hockey is a popular and growing sport in the state of New York. 151 high schools field sanctioned varsity teams competing in the New York State Public High School Athletic Association.  76 club and non-sanctioned New York High School Hockey teams compete in New York State Amateur Hockey Association.

NYSPHSAA 
The sanctioned teams compete from end of November till Mid-March with maximum number of practices and games. These teams are divided into two divisions, I and II. Each based on strength of program and considered "rolling" divisions allowing teams to switch divisions each year. The sanctioned Varsity teams are divided into sections used by every sport under NYSPHSAA; Sections I, II, III, IV, V, VI, VII, IX, and X. Each section has different sets of rules for eligibility of Catholic teams to participate in the State Tournament. Sections I and VI do not allow Catholic schools to compete for the Public State Tournament.

NYSAHA 
NYSAHA is the New York state affiliate of USA Hockey. The "club" teams are divided into two divisions, large school and small school. Each section is divided into four regions East, West, Central, and North who all follow the NYSAHA Guidebook for state bound eligibility. The majority of the teams come from Long Island, Broome County, Hudson Valley, and Western New York. The non-sanctioned Club teams are divided into sections used by all amateur hockey teams under the NYSAHA umbrella. NYSAHA has set guidelines on the state bound teams and depending on the number of teams' from each section that are state bound determine how many teams' from each section will attend the three-day state tournament for large and small school tournament. Eight teams participate in three-day state tournament at host-city in a point system to determine the top four teams to compete in semi-finals and then eventually the State championship.

The non-sanctioned teams have no official start and stop date and no limit on the minimum and maximum of games. West Section begins league play around the end of November and end the season in March.  East, Central, and North sections compete from September till the end of March.

State Tournament 
NYSPHSAA, each section has different sets of rules for eligibility of Catholic teams to participate in the State Tournament.  Section I and VI do not allow Catholic schools to compete for the Public State Tournament. The Catholic schools from Section I and VI meet in Catholic High School State Athletic Association one game championship. NYSPHSAA has pre-determined state tournament brackets with each section sending one team per section and at-large teams in one-game elimination. The Final Four for Divisions I, and II were played in Utica, New York's Memorial Auditorium for many years until recently when they have been held at the LECOM Harborcenter in Buffalo, New York.

History 
Though high school hockey in New York can be dated back to the mid-1940s, the first league—called the Northern New York Scholastic Hockey League—was formed in 1948 and comprised teams from Massena, Norfolk, Potsdam and Saranac Lake.  One of the League's founders, Don Spotswood, was a 1934 Clarkson College graduate who taught high school mathematics in the then Norfolk School District (today Norwood-Norfolk).  Clarkson College, along with St. Lawrence University, were significant influences in the birth of high school hockey in this region.

Buffalo Explorer High School Club Hockey League was the first club hockey league in Western New York, starting in 1972.  Southtowns High School Club Hockey League began in 1974 and Western New York High School Club Hockey League in 1976.

NYSPHSAA recognized high school hockey starting in 1980 with official state tournament being held. Not every section started at the same time and not every team that was sanctioned was allowed to participate in the sanctioned State tournament.  Section VI (Western New York) did not allow its champion to participate until 2001. NYSAHA recognized high school hockey in 1982 but league championship were being held as early as 1972 in Buffalo. NYSAHA divided into two divisions in 2002 as prior to that year, only one championship was awarded.

In 2008-09, there was no club state championship. For the 2009-10 season, WNYHSCHL will join AAU.

Alumni 
Dustin Brown, Robert Esche, Todd Marchant, Lee Stempniak, Brian Gionta, Marty Reasoner, Craig Conroy, Rob Schremp, Todd Krygier, Guy Hebert, Brooks Orpik, Patrick Kane, Aaron Miller Lance Miller, Dave Reinstein Chris Higgins, Mike Komisarek, Rob Scuderi and Erik Cole are among the many players that participated in New York high school hockey.

Historical timeline 
1947 - Norfolk High School fields their first team (today, Norwood-Norfolk)
1969 - Town of Oyster Bay High School Club Hockey League forms
1972 - Buffalo Explorer High School Club Hockey League forms
1973 - New York Islanders High School Club Hockey League forms
1974 - Southtowns High School Club Hockey League forms
1976 - Western New York High School Club Hockey League forms
1980 - New York State Public High School Athletic Association crowns its first champion
1982 - New York State Amateur Hockey Association crowns its first champion
1990 - Section VI recognizes hockey as official sport
2001 - Section VI sends its champion to state tournament
2002 - NYSAHA crowns two champions - Large and Small School

NYSPHSAA teams 

 Greece Lightning and Greece Thunder were one team.
^ Two championships were when Aquinas was a Division II team

NYSAHA Club teams

Defunct programs

NYSPHSAA Championships 

 Shared Championship

CHSAA Championships 
 2020

NYSAHA Championships

References 
 New York State Public High School Athletic Association. N.Y.S.P.H.S.A.A.
 New York State Amateur Hockey Association. N.Y.S.A.H.A.
NYSAHA State Tournament Winners   https://cdn1.sportngin.com/attachments/document/da34-2131286/State_Winners_1980-1994.pdf

External links
Long Island High School Hockey
Section 3 High School Hockey
Section V High School Hockey

High school ice hockey in the United States
H
H